Engineering consulting is the practice of performing engineering as a Consulting Engineer. It assists individuals, public and private companies with process management, idea organization, product design, fabrication, MRO (Maintenance, Repair and Operations), servicing, tech advice, tech specifications, tech estimating, costing, budgeting, valuation, branding, and marketing.

Engineering consulting firms may involve Civil, Structural, Mechanical, Electrical, Environmental, Chemical, Industrial, and Agricultural, Electronics and Telecom, Computer and Network, Instrumentation and Control, IT, Manufacturing and Production, Aerospace, Marine, Fire and Safety, etc. Consulting engineers may also assist in marketing.

Education 
To practice as independent self employed Consulting Engineer requires at least a Bachelor's Degree in Engineering and a Government License.

References

See also 
 FIDIC

Consulting by type
Engineering disciplines